Anil Teja Nidamanuru (born 22 August 1994) is an Indian-born cricketer who plays for the Netherlands cricket team. He has also played for Auckland in New Zealand domestic cricket.

Personal life
Nidamanuru was born in Vijayawada, India. As of 2021 he was a business development manager for a workflow management company, working alongside fellow Netherlands international Stephan Myburgh.

Cricket career
Nidamanuru made his Twenty20 debut for Auckland in the 2017–18 Super Smash on 13 December 2017. He made his List A debut for Auckland in the 2018–19 Ford Trophy on 14 November 2018.

In 2019, Nidamanuru moved to the Netherlands. He took up a position as player-coach at Utrecht-based Kampong Cricket Club. He later switched to Punjab Rotterdam and scored 104 runs from 42 balls in one game against VOC Rotterdam in the 2021 Dutch T20 Cup.

In May 2022, he was named in the Dutch One Day International (ODI) squad for their series against the West Indies. He made his ODI debut on 31 May 2022, for the Netherlands against the West Indies. In July 2022, he was named in the Netherlands' Twenty20 International (T20I) squad for the 2022 ICC Men's T20 World Cup Global Qualifier B tournament in Zimbabwe. He made his T20I debut on 11 July 2022, for the Netherlands against Papua New Guinea.

References

External links
 

1994 births
Living people
New Zealand cricketers
Dutch cricketers
Netherlands One Day International cricketers
Netherlands Twenty20 International cricketers
Auckland cricketers